Limhamns FF is a Swedish football club located in Limhamn, Malmö.

Background
Since their foundation in 2009 Limhamns FF has participated in the lower divisions of the Swedish football league system.  The club currently plays in Division 4 Skåne Sydvästra which is the sixth tier of Swedish football. They play their home matches at the Limhamns IP in Limhamn, Malmö.

Limhamns FF are affiliated to the Skånes Fotbollförbund.

Season to season

Footnotes

External links
 Limhamns FF – Official website
 Limhamns FF Facebook
 Limhamn-player plays against Brazil
 The grass is green again in Limhamn
 Öresunds IBK becomes Limhamns FF

Football clubs in Skåne County
Association football clubs established in 2009
Sport in Malmö
Football clubs in Malmö
2009 establishments in Sweden